Qasemabad-e Qanat Shur (also Romanized as Qāsemābād-e Qanāt Shūr; also known as Qāsemābād) is a village in Kahrizak Rural District, Kahrizak District, Ray County, Tehran Province, Iran. At the 2006 census, its population was 43, in 11 families.

References 

Populated places in Ray County, Iran